Joan Elsa Donley (16 March 1916 – 4 December 2005) was a Canadian-born New Zealand nurse and midwife. Donley was a key figure who shaped midwifery and the home birth movement in New Zealand.

Biography 

Donley was born in Regina, Saskatchewan in 1916. She trained as a nurse at Saskatoon City Hospital as she could not afford to train as a doctor, and worked in a hospital in British Columbia.

In 1964, Donley emigrated to New Zealand with her family, opening a fish market in Grey Lynn. After separating from her husband in 1969, she returned to healthcare, gaining a certificate in maternity from the National Women's Hospital, and completed a course in midwifery at St Helens in 1971. After which, she worked at Waitakere Hospital for two years.

When West Auckland midwife and home birth proponent Vera Ellis-Crowther began retiring in the 1974, she asked Donley and her colleague Carolyn Young to take over her practice, so that home birth services could continue to be offered in Auckland. In the same year, Donley delivered her first home birth baby, her granddaughter. Donley worked as a home birth midwife for 21 years until 1995, attending approximately 750 births.

Donley was a strong proponent of homebirth, believing it was a feminist and political act, challenging to the white, male-controlled professions of obstetrics and gynaecology. Donley was a key member who formed the Auckland Home Birth Association in 1978 she formed the Auckland Home Birth Association, and the New Zealand Domiciliary Midwives Society in 1981. In 1986, Donley published Save the Midwife, a history of New Zealand midwifery which greatly criticised the state of midwifery in the mid-1980s. The 1990 Nurses Amendment Act, which allowed for midwives to take primary responsibility for women during pregnancy, childbirth and the postnatal period, was authored by Helen Clark (then the Minister of Health), in part due to Donley's influence, as she regularly wrote to Clark about her concerns.

Donley became an Officer of the Order of the British Empire in the 1990 New Year Honours, was awarded the New Zealand 1990 Commemoration Medal, a New Zealand Suffrage Centennial Medal in 1993 and an honorary masters degree in midwifery by the Auckland Institute of Technology in 1997. In 2001, the New Zealand College of Midwives established a research arm, which was named after Donley. After suffering from a stroke, Donley died in Auckland in 2005.

Personal life 

Donley married her husband Robert Fuhland Donley in Vancouver on 22 November 1941. Together, they had five children. The pair divorced in 1970.

References

1916 births
2005 deaths
Activists from Saskatchewan
Canadian emigrants to New Zealand
Canadian midwives
Canadian nurses
Canadian women's rights activists
New Zealand feminists
New Zealand midwives
New Zealand Officers of the Order of the British Empire
New Zealand women nurses
New Zealand women's rights activists
People from Regina, Saskatchewan
Recipients of the New Zealand Suffrage Centennial Medal 1993
Canadian women nurses